Alfred Staszewicz (30 January 1896 – 20 October 1973) was a Polish fencer. He competed in the team épée event at the 1936 Summer Olympics. He was also the only Pole who competed in the Inter-Allied Games in 1919.

References

External links
 

1896 births
1973 deaths
Polish male fencers
Olympic fencers of Poland
Fencers at the 1936 Summer Olympics
Place of birth missing